Vladimir Davidovich Baranov-Rossiné (13 January 1888, Velyka Lepetykha – 1944, Auschwitz) was a Ukrainian painter and sculptor active in France. Baranov-Rossiné was of Jewish origin. His work belonged to the avant-garde movement of Cubo-Futurism. He was also an inventor.

Biography

Vladimir Baranoff-Rossine was born in Kherson, Russian Empire (present day Ukraine) under the name Shulim Wolf Leib Baranov.

In 1902 he studied at the School of the Society for the Furthering of the Arts in St. Petersburg. From 1903 to 1907 he attended the Imperial Academy of Arts in St. Petersburg.

In 1908 he exhibited with the group Zveno (The Link) in Kyiv organized by the artist David Burliuk and his brother Wladimir Burliuk.

In 1910 he moved to Paris, where until 1914 he was a resident in the artist's colony La Ruche together with Alexander Archipenko, Sonia Delaunay-Terk, Nathan Altman and others. He exhibited regularly in Paris after 1911.

He returned to Russia in 1914. In 1916 he had a solo exhibition in Oslo. In 1918 he had exhibits with the union of artists Mir Iskusstva (World of Art) in Petrograd (St.Petersburg). In the same year, he had an exhibition with the group Jewish Society for the Furthering of the Arts in Moscow, together with Nathan Altman, El Lissitzky and David Shterenberg. He participated at the First State Free Art Exhibition in Petrograd in 1919.

In 1919 he married Yudin Raisa from Kherson. In March 1920 they had a son named Evgeny, but Raisa died from complications after child birth.

In 1922 Baranoff-Rossine was the teacher at the Higher Artistic-Technical Workshops (VKhUTEMAS) in Moscow. and exhibited in the First Russian Art Exhibition in Berlin.

In 1924 he had the first presentation of his optophonic piano during a performance at the Bolshoi Theatre in Moscow - a synaesthetic instrument that was capable of creating sounds and coloured lights, patterns and textures simultaneously.

In 1925 he emigrated to France.

Continuously experimenting, Baranoff-Rossine applied the art of colour to military art with the technique of camouflage or the Cameleon process and this was marketed with Robert Delaunay. Baranov-Rossine is credited as an author of pointillist and dynamic military camouflage. He also invented a "photochromometer" that allowed the determination of the qualities of precious stones. In another field, he perfected a machine that made, sterilized and distributed fizzy drinks, the "Multiperco", and this received several technical awards at the time.

During the German occupation Baranoff-Rossine was deported to Auschwitz, a German concentration camp and murdered there in 1944 by the Nazis.

See also
 List of Russian artists

References

External links

Website dedicated to Wladimir Baranoff-Rossine
A web-site including his invention of the Optophonic Piano

1888 births
1944 deaths
Artists from Kherson
People from Khersonsky Uyezd
Ukrainian Jews
Soviet emigrants to France
French people of Ukrainian-Jewish descent
French people who died in Auschwitz concentration camp
Russian avant-garde
20th-century Russian painters
Russian male painters
Jewish artists
Cubist artists
Modern artists
Visual music artists
Russian inventors
Academic staff of Vkhutemas
Camoufleurs
20th-century French inventors
Soviet inventors
Soviet people who died in Auschwitz concentration camp
Ukrainian people who died in Nazi concentration camps
Ukrainian Jews who died in the Holocaust
20th-century Russian male artists